Oak Grove is a home rule-class city adjacent to the Fort Campbell army base in Christian County, Kentucky, in the United States. The population was 7,489 as of the 2010 U.S. Census. It is part of the Clarksville, Tennessee metropolitan area.

History
The first post office in Oak Grove was established in 1828. The community was named for oak trees near the original town site. The Clarksville Railroad was extended to Oak Grove in the 19th century.

With construction of nearby Fort Campbell in the Second World War, Oak Grove's population grew. The city was incorporated by the state legislature on September 24, 1974.

1994 New Life Massage Place murders 
22 year old Candy Belt and 18 year old Gloria Ross were both massage therapist who secretly worked as prostitutes at the New Life Massage Place run by Tammy Papler. At 4am on September 20, 1994 the two women were found by other employees shot, stabbed and killed with their bodies placed in a storeroom where it was discovered by other employees. The employees complained of police harassment, attempts at blackmail and extortion, as well as police expecting services from the prostitutes. In 2013, 3 men were charged with the killings, 2 former police officers, and they were found guilty. In 2017, all 3 were acquitted.

Geography
Oak Grove is located in southeastern Christian County at  (36.658374, -87.419565). Its southern border is the Tennessee state line, and it is bordered to the west by Fort Campbell. Hopkinsville, the Christian County seat, touches the northwest corner of Oak Grove along Fort Campbell Boulevard (U.S. Route 41 Alternate). Interstate 24 forms the northeast boundary of Oak Grove, with access from exit 86 (US 41 Alt.) and exit 89 (Kentucky Route 115). The city of Clarksville, Tennessee, is along the southern boundary of Oak Grove.

Demographics
As of the census of 2000, there were 7,064 people, 2,529 households, and 1,820 families residing in the city. The racial makeup of the city was 61.72% White, 25.81% African American, 1.03% Native American or Alaska Native, 1.64% Asian, 0.51% Pacific Islander, 3.94% from other races, and 5.35% from two or more races. Hispanics or Latinos of any race were 9.41% of the population.

There were 2,529 households, out of which 50.2% had children under the age of 18 living with them, 58.5% were married couples living together, 10.3% had a female householder with no husband present, and 28.0% were non-families. 17.6% of all households were made up of individuals, and 0.8% had someone living alone who was 65 years of age or older. The average household size was 2.79 and the average family size was 3.14.

The age distribution was 32.2% under the age of 18, 23.4% from 18 to 24, 38.6% from 25 to 44, 4.9% from 45 to 64, and 1.0% who were 65 years of age or older. The median age was 24 years. For every 100 females, there are 113.0 males. For every 100 females age 18 and over, there were 115.7 males.

The median income for a household in the city was $32,235, and the median income for a family was $31,972. Males had a median income of $25,497 versus $18,994 for females. The per capita income for the city was $13,769. About 7.9% of families and 10.6% of the population were below the poverty line, including 13.1% of those under age 18 and 8.0% of those age 65 or over.

Climate
The climate in this area is characterized by hot, humid summers and generally mild to cool winters.  According to the Köppen Climate Classification system, Oak Grove has a humid subtropical climate, abbreviated "Cfa" on climate maps.

References

External links
City of Oak Grove official website
Oak Grove Tourism Commission

Cities in Christian County, Kentucky
Cities in Kentucky
Clarksville metropolitan area
Populated places established in 1974